Siv Elisabeth Margaretha Wärnfeldt (born 1956) is a Swedish author, opera and concert singer.

Education and career 
Wärnfeldt took a bachelor's degree at Stockholm University in music, art and theatre science in 1979. She wrote her dissertation on the Swedish composer Torbjörn Iwan Lundquist. She studied music and voice at the University of Music and Performing Arts, Vienna, Austria. For many years her vocal teacher was the Hovsångare (Swedish court singer) Birgit Nilsson. In 1986, Wärnfeldt was awarded both the Birgit Nilsson Prize and the Wagner Prize. Her opera debut in 1989 was in the part of Halka at the Silesian Opera in Bytom, Poland. Wärnfeldt has since sung, among others, the part of Donna Anna in Mozart's Don Giovanni at the Södra Teatern, directed by Johannes Schaaf. Other notable parts are Anna Bolena in Gaetano Donizetti's Anna Bolena, Contessa in Mozart's The Marriage of Figaro, Rosalinda in Strauss's Die Fledermaus and Leonore in Verdi's Il trovatore.

Wärnfeldt has written several articles since her time at the university of Stockholm and has also been a guest lecturer at the University of Vienna, and at the Royal College of Music, Stockholm. In 2012, she received an M.Phil. from the Åbo Academy. Wärnfeldt is a member of the Swedish writers' union, Sveriges Författarförbund.

Texts and libretti written by Wärnfeldt 
It's like the light, a scenic novel by Elisabeth Wärnfeldt based on the poems by Emily Dickinson. Music by Kai Nieminen and produced by Staffan Aspegren
Symphony No. 231, "About Völvan..." with music by Leif Segerstam
She, with music by Leif Segerstam
Road map..., with music by Leif Segerstam
Völvan, with music by Leif Segerstam
Symphony No. 232, with music by Leif Segerstam
Symphony No. 233, with music by Leif Segerstam
Symphony No. 234, with music by Leif Segerstam
Symphony No. 241, with music by Leif Segerstam
Symphony No. 242, with music by Leif Segerstam
Symphony No. 246, with music by Leif Segerstam
Requiem, "Per-Olof Gillblad in memoriam" with music by Leif Segerstam

Books 
1985 - Solvarv
1997 - Anna och Herr Gud
2011 - Red

Music written for, dedicated to or first performed by Wärnfeldt 
Torbjörn Iwan Lundquist - Siebenmal Rilke, songs for soprano and piano or orchestra
Torbjörn Iwan Lundquist - A new gospel, to texts by Dag Hammarskjöld and Leo Tolstoy
Jan Wallgren - Boye-sånger, to the poems by Karin Boye
Boel Dirke - Damen det brinner, a jazz opera, to texts by Bodil Malmsten
Hans Ove Olsson - Petrarca Sonett for song and piano, to text by Petrarch
Olov Olofsson - 700 days, a scenic oratorio, to text by Maria Jacobs
Monica Dominique - Mr God it's Anna, playing the part of the Mum
Josef Stolz - Kind und Tod, to texts by Hugo Ball
Ulf Johansson - Lobeshymnus, to texts by Rainer Maria Rilke
Lars Jergen Olson - Vägmärken, to texts by Dag Hammarskjöld
Lars Jergen Olson - Fem Kärlekssånger, to texts by Maria Wine
Lars Jergen Olson - Sex sånger, to texts by J.L. Runeberg
Lars Jergen Olson - Requiem (recorded but not yet performed)
Stefan Säfsten - Tre nya sånger, to texts by Dag Hammarskjöld and Nelson Mandela
Stefan Säfsten - Stormen for Soprano and Saxophone quartet, to texts by Ebba Lindqvist
The part of Witwe Bolte in Alexander Blechinger’s Max And Moritz to libretto by Wilhelm Busch at the St. Margarethen Opera Festival, world opening 17 June 2008

Discography
2000 - Monica Dominique: Herr Gud, det är Anna (Mr God it’s Anna)
2005 - Reflection; songs by Lars Jergen Olson 
2006 – Opera album Homage to Birgit Nilsson with Moravian Philharmonic Orchestra conducted by Peter Schmelzer
2007 - Lights in Wintertime Christmas carols with the Högalidskyrkan Choir conducted by Anna Lena Engström
2008 - Songs of love with Franz Liszt's Petrarca Sonnets among others, pianist Stefan Nymark
2008 - Felix Mendelssohn's Hear my prayer with Kinna kyrkokör conducted by Hans Åke Månsson
2008 - Alexander Blechinger’s Max and Moritz

References

External links 
 elisabethwarnfeldt.com

1956 births
Living people
Swedish operatic sopranos
Swedish sopranos
20th-century Swedish women writers
21st-century Swedish women writers
Alumni